Cancer virus refers to:

 An oncovirus, a virus that can cause cancer. 
 Also generally the role of viruses in carcinogenesis.
 On the other hand to an oncolytic virus, a virus that preferentially infects and lyses cancer cells.